Marco Kadlec (born 28 February 2000) is an Austrian footballer who plays for Juniors OÖ.

Club career
On 2 February 2022, Kadlec signed with Juniors OÖ.

References

2000 births
Austrian people of Czech descent
Living people
Austrian footballers
Austria youth international footballers
Association football midfielders
FC Admira Wacker Mödling players
FC Juniors OÖ players
Austrian Football Bundesliga players
2. Liga (Austria) players
Austrian Regionalliga players